Kathleen Lynne Quirk is a third-generation Irish-American businesswoman who is executive vice-president, CFO, and Treasurer of Freeport-McMoRan (FCX), the second-largest publicly owned copper producer in the world.

Early life
Quirk was born in New Orleans, Louisiana.

She earned a B.S. in Accounting from Louisiana State University.

Career
Quirk joined Freeport-McMoRan, a Fortune 500 mining company, in 1989, becoming Chief Financial Officer (CFO) and Executive Vice-President on December 10, 2003, and Treasurer in 2000.

She has been Commissioner of PT Freeport Indonesia at Freeport-McMoRan Inc., since April 2000. She served as Senior Vice President of Freeport-McMoRan Inc. and as Vice-President of Finance and Business Development from December 10, 2003 to March 2000.

Quirk was named among the "25 Highest Paid Women CFOs" in the world during 2010 by Fortune Magazine and, in 2015, was listed among the "Female CFOs in the Fortune 500". Bloomberg reported her 2016 income as $8,309,573.

She was appointed one of the 10 Directors of Vulcan Materials Company and was elected to the Board of Directors in October 2017.

Philanthropy
She has served as a member of the Board of Directors of the Valley of the Sun United Way.

References

Living people
American people of Irish descent
Louisiana State University alumni
Women in mining
People from New Orleans
Year of birth missing (living people)